Justus Doolittle (Pinyin: Lú Gōngmíng; Foochow Romanized: Lù Gŭng-mìng; June 23, 1824, Rutland, New York - June 15, 1880, Clinton, New York) was an American Board missionary to China.

Life
Justus Doolittle was born in Rutland, New York on June 23, 1824. In 1846 he graduated from Hamilton College, and in 1849 from Auburn Theological Seminary. Having deliberately chosen China as his field of labor, he sailed for Fuzhou with his wife soon after graduation, and arrived there on May 31. In February, 1864, he left China for a visit to the United States on account of his health. In 1872 he entered the service of the Presbyterian Board at Shanghai, but was soon compelled to return home disabled. On June 15, 1880, he died in Clinton, New York. He is buried in Sunset Hill Cemetery, Clinton, NY.

Doolittle was most famous for his Social Life of the Chinese (Volume 1 and 2), a thorough and valuable work on the details of Chinese life. He also had a significant collection of Chinese coins, which was sold in June 1881.

In 1870-71 he accompanied the photographer John Thomson. Thomson's photographs of this journey were published as Foochow and the River Min (1873), a total of 46 copies.

Doolittle kept a journal, "Diary; covering his life as a foreign missionary in Foochow, China, until the year 1873", now in the Hamilton College Archives and available in Hamilton College's Digital Collections.

Publications

Doolittle published prolifically in a wide range of journals, including Chinese Recorder and Missionary Journal, of which he was briefly an editor.

Fuzhou dialect

English

Works

References

External links
 Introduction of Social life of the Chinese

Protestant missionaries in China
Protestant writers
Christian missionaries in Fujian
1824 births
1880 deaths
American sinologists
Auburn Theological Seminary alumni
Hamilton College (New York) alumni
American expatriates in China
American Protestant missionaries
American numismatists